Les Hauts-d'Anjou (literally The Heights of Anjou) is a commune in the Maine-et-Loire department of western France. The municipality was established on 15 December 2016 by merger of the former communes of Brissarthe, Contigné, Cherré, Champigné, Marigné, Sœurdres and Querré. On 1 January 2019, the former commune Châteauneuf-sur-Sarthe was merged into Les Hauts-d'Anjou.

Population
The population data given in the table below refer to the commune in its geography as of January 2020.

See also 
Communes of the Maine-et-Loire department

References 

Communes of Maine-et-Loire